This is a list of amphibian species found in the Kerala, India.

Order: Anura (Frogs)

Family: Bufonidae (True toads)

Genus: Duttaphrynus

Duttaphrynus beddomii (Beddome's toad)

Duttaphrynus melanostictus (common Asian toad)

Duttaphrynus microtympanum (southern hill toad)

Duttaphrynus parietalis (Indian toad)

Duttaphrynus scaber (Ferguson's toad)

Duttaphrynus silentvalleyensis (Silent Valley toad)

Genus: Ghatophryne

Ghatophryne ornata (Malabar torrent toad)

Ghatophryne rubigina (Kerala stream toad)

Genus: Pedostibes

Pedostibes tuberculosus (Malabar tree toad)

Family: Dicroglossidae (Fork-tongued frogs)

Genus: Euphlyctis

Euphlyctis cyanophlyctis (skittering frog)

Euphlyctis hexadactylus (green pond frog)

Genus: Hoplobatrachus

Hoplobatrachus crassus (Jerdon's bullfrog)

Hoplobatrachus tigerinus (Indian bullfrog)

Genus: Minervarya

Minervarya sahyadris (Minervarya frog)

Genus: Sphaerotheca

Sphaerotheca breviceps (Indian burrowing frog)

Genus: Zakerana

Zakerana brevipalmata (short-webbed frog)

Zakerana keralensis (Kerala warty frog)

Zakerana nilagirica (Nilgiris wart frog)

Zakerana parambikulamana (Parambikulam wart frog)

Zakerana rufescens (Malabar wart frog)

Family: Micrixalidae (Dancing frogs)

Genus: Micrixalus

Micrixalus adonis

Micrixalus elegans (elegant dancing frog)

Micrixalus frigidus (cold stream dancing frog)

Micrixalus fuscus (dusky torrent frog)

Micrixalus gadgili (Gadgil's torrent frog)

Micrixalus herrei (Kallar torrent frog)

Micrixalus kurichiyari (Kurichiyar torrent frog)

Micrixalus mallani (Mallan's torrent frog)

Micrixalus nelliyampathi (Nelliyampathi torrent frog)

Micrixalus nigraventris (black-bellied torrent frog)

Micrixalus nudis (naked torrent frog)

Micrixalus phyllophilus (pink-thighed torrent frog)

Micrixalus sairandhri (Sairandhri torrent frog)

Micrixalus sali (Sali's torrent frog)

Micrixalus saxicola (Malabar torrent frog)

Micrixalus silvaticus (forest torrent frog)

Micrixalus thampii (Thampi's torrent frog)

Family: Microhylidae (Narrow-mouthed frogs)

Genus: Melanobatrachus

Melanobatrachus indicus (black microhylid frog)

Genus: Microhyla

Microhyla ornata (ornate narrow-mouthed frog)

Microhyla rubra (reddish narrow-mouthed frog)

Microhyla sholigari (Sholigari Microhylid frog)

Genus: Mysticellus

Mysticellus franki (Franky's narrow-mouthed frog)

Genus: Uperodon

Uperodon anamalaiensis (Anamalai dot/balloon frog)

Uperodon globulosus (Indian balloon frog)

Uperodon montanus (Jerdon's balloon frog)

Uperodon systoma (marbled balloon frog)

Uperodon taprobanica (painted frog)

Uperodon triangularis (Malabar frog)

Uperodon variegata (Variegated frog)

Family: Nasikabatrachidae (Purple frogs)

Genus: Nasikabatrachus

Nasikabatrachus sahyadrensis (purple frog)

Family: Nyctibatrachidae (Night frogs)

Genus: Nyctibatrachus

Nyctibatrachus acanthodermis (spinular night frog)

Nyctibatrachus aliciae (Alicia's night frog)

Nyctibatrachus anamallaiensis (Anamallai night frog)

Nyctibatrachus beddomii (Beddome's night frog)

Nyctibatrachus deccanensis (Deccan night frog)

Nyctibatrachus deveni (Deven's night frog)

Nyctibatrachus grandis (Grandi's night frog)

Nyctibatrachus indraneili (Indraneil's night frog)

Nyctibatrachus kempholeyensis (Kempholey night frog)

Nyctibatrachus major (Malabar night frog)

Nyctibatrachus minimus (miniature night frog)

Nyctibatrachus minor (Kerala night frog)

Nyctibatrachus periyar (Periyar night frog)

Nyctibatrachus pillaii (Pillai's night frog)

Nyctibatrachus poocha (meowing night frog)

Nyctibatrachus vasanthi (Kalakad wrinkled frog)

Nyctibatrachus vrijeuni (VUB night frog)

Family: Ranidae (True frogs)

Genus: Clinotarsus

Clinotarsus curtipes (bicolored frog)

Genus: Hydrophylax

Hydrophylax malabaricus (fungoid frog)

Genus: Indosylvirana

Indosylvirana aurantiaca (Boulenger's golden backed frog)

Indosylvirana doni (Don's golden backed frog)

Indosylvirana flavescens (yellowish golden backed frog)

Indosylvirana indica (Indian golden backed frog)

Indosylvirana intermedius (Rao's golden backed frog)

Indosylvirana magna (large golden backed frog)

Indosylvirana sreeni (Sreeni's golden backed frog)

Indosylvirana urbis (urban golden backed frog)

Family: Ranixalidae (Leaping frogs)

Genus: Indirana

Indirana beddomii (Beddome's leaping frog)

Indirana brachytarsus (Anamallai's leaping frog)

Indirana diplosticta (spotted leaping frog)

Indirana leptodactyla (Boulenger's leaping frog)

Indirana phrynoderma (toad skinned leaping frog)

Indirana semipalmata (toad skinned leaping frog)

Family: Rhacophoridae (Tree frogs)

Genus: Beddomixalus

Beddomixalus bijui (Kadalar swamp frog)

Genus: Ghatixalus

Ghatixalus asterops (Ghat tree frog)

Ghatixalus variabilis (green tree frog)

Genus: Mercurana

Mercurana myristicapalustris (Myristica swamp frog)

Genus: Polypedates

Polypedates maculatus (Indian tree frog)

Polypedates occidentalis (western/charpa tree frog)

Polypedates pseudocruciger (false hour-glass tree frog)

Genus: Pseudophilautus

Pseudophilautus kani (kani bush frog)

Pseudophilautus wynaadensis (Waynad bush frog)

Genus: Raorchestes

Raorchestes agasthyaensis (Agasthiamalai bush frog)

Raorchestes akroparallagi (variable bush frog)

Raorchestes anili (Anil's bush frog)

Raorchestes archeos (archaic bush frog)

Raorchestes aureus (golden-eyed bush frog)

Raorchestes beddomii (Beddome's bush frog)

Raorchestes blandus (pleasant bush frog)

Raorchestes bobingeri (Bob Inger's bush frog)

Raorchestes chalazodes (chalazodes bubble-nest frog)

Raorchestes charius (Seshachar's bush frog)

Raorchestes chlorosomma (green-eyed bush frog)

Raorchestes chotta (small bush frog)

Raorchestes chromasynchysi (confusing green bush frog)

Raorchestes crustai (bark bush frog)

Raorchestes dubois (Kodaikanal bush frog)

Raorchestes flaviventris (yellow-bellied bush frog)

Raorchestes glandulosus (glandular bush frog)

Raorchestes graminirupes (Ponmudi bush frog)

Raorchestes griet (Griet bush frog)

Raorchestes jayarami (Jayaram's bush frog)

Raorchestes johnceei (Johnceei's bush frog)

Raorchestes kadalarensis (Kadalar bush frog)

Raorchestes kaikatti (Kaikatt's bush frog)

Raorchestes kakachi (Kakachi bush frog)

Raorchestes leucolatus (white patch bush frog)

Raorchestes manohari (beautiful reed bush frog)

Raorchestes marki (Mark's bush frog)

Raorchestes munnarensis (Munnar bush frog)

Raorchestes nerostagona (Kalpetta yellow bush frog)

Raorchestes ochlandrae (ochlandrae reed bush frog)

Raorchestes ponmudi (large Ponmudi bush frog)

Raorchestes ravii (Ravi's bush frog)

Raorchestes resplendens (resplendent shrub frog)

Raorchestes signatus (star-eyed bush frog)

Raorchestes sushili (Sushil's bush frog)

Raorchestes theuerkaufi (Theuerkauf's bush frog)

Raorchestes tinniens (Nilgiri bush frog)

Raorchestes travancoricus (Travancore bush frog)

Raorchestes tuberohumerus (Kudremukh bush frog)

Raorchestes uthamani (Uthaman's reed bush frog)

Genus: Rhacophorus

Rhacophorus calcadensis (Kalakad gliding frog)

Rhacophorus lateralis (small tree frog)

Rhacophorus malabaricus (Malabar gliding frog)

Rhacophorus pseudomalabaricus (false Malabar gliding frog)

Order: Gymnophiona (Caecilians)

Family: Ichthyophiidae (Asiatic tailed caecilians)

Genus: Ichthyophis

Ichthyophis beddomei (yellow-striped caecilian)

Ichthyophis bombayensis (Bombay caecilian)

Ichthyophis kodaguensis (Kodagu striped caecilian)

Ichthyophis longicephalus (long-headed caecilian)

Ichthyophis tricolor (three-colored caecilian)

Genus: Uraeotyphlus

Uraeotyphlus interruptus (Chengalam caecilian)

Uraeotyphlus malabaricus (Malabar tailed caecilian)

Uraeotyphlus menoni (Kerala caecilian, Menon's caecilian)

Uraeotyphlus narayani (Narayan's caecilian)

Uraeotyphlus oommeni (Bonnacord caecilian)

Uraeotyphlus oxyurus (red caecilian)

Family: Indotyphlidae (Common caecilians)

Genus: Gegeneophis

Gegeneophis carnosus (Peria Peak caecilian)

Gegeneophis primus (Malabar cardomom caecilian)

Gegeneophis ramaswamii (forest caecilian)

Gegeneophis tejaswini (Tejaswini caecilian)

References 
 A checklist of amphibians of Kerala, India by Sandeep Das
 A survey of the Amphibian Fauna of Kerala- Distribution and Status, Zoos’ Print Journal 20(1) 1723–1735 by M.I. Andrews, Sanil George and Jaimon Joseph (2005)
 Common Amphibians of Kerala: Frogs and Toads – PS Sivaprasad

External links 
 Global Amphibian Assessment
 AmphibiaWeb
 Amphibians of the Western Ghats

India
Amphibians
Amphibians